McMurray or MacMurray may refer to:

McMurray (surname)
McMurray, Pennsylvania
Fort McMurray, urban service area in Alberta, Canada
Lake McMurray, Washington
McMurray Formation, stratigraphical unit
McMurray test, physical examination of the knee
McMurray House (disambiguation), various listed buildings in the United States
MacMurray College

See also
McMurry
Murray (disambiguation)